had been a bus company in Suwa area Nagano Prefecture, Japan until March 2011 because the company has been be taken over by Alpico Kotsu. After merging to Alpico Kotsu, Suwa Bus is a nickname which Alpico Kotsu Group operates on Suwa area.

History
July 3, 1919 - Incorporation of Suwa Jidōsha K.K.
July 1941 - Setting of greater Suwa area as business area
December 1963 - Acquisition by Matsumoto Electric Railway as a subsidiary
May 1981 - Change of corporate name to Suwa Bus K.K.
December 1984 - Opening of Chuo Kosoku Bus Iida route (Iida–Shinjuku)
November 1986 - Opening of Chūō Expressway Bus Chino Route (Chūō Expressway Chino Bus Stop–Shinjuku)
July 1987 - Opening of Chūō Expressway Bus Suwa–Okaya Route (Kami-Suwa/Okaya–Shinjuku)
September 1988 - Opening of Misuzu Highway Bus
July 1989 - Opening of Chino–Nagoya route via Chūō Expressway (discontinued in April 1997)
December 1989 - Opening of Chino–Osaka route via Chūō Expressway
March 1993 - Opening of Fujimi/Chino–Nagano route via Nagano Expressway (discontinued in 1996)
August 1999 - Opening of Chino city welfare bus
September 1999 - Opening of "Karinchan Bus" circulation route in Suwa
July 2000 - Opening of Okaya citizens bus "Silky Bus" 
July 2004 - Opening of "Swan Bus" Lake Suwa circulation route in Okaya

Lines

Highway Lines
Okaya, Suwa⇔Shinjuku (Chuo Kosoku Bus Suwa/Okaya Line: collaboration with Keio Bus, Fuji Express, Yamanashi Kotsu, JR Bus Kanto)
Iida⇔Shinjuku (Chuo Kosoku Bus Iida Line: collaboration with Keio Bus, Ina Bus, Shin'nan Kotsu)
Chino, Suwa, Okaya⇔Osaka (Alpine Suwa Go: collaboration with Hankyu Bus)
Chino BT, Kamisuwa Station, Shimosuwa, Osachi, Okaya City Office, Imai, Chuo. Exp Tatsuno⇔Kyoto-Fukakusa, Meishin-Oyamazaki, Takatsuki BS, Ibaraki BS, Senri New Town, Shin-Osaka, Osaka (Umeda)

Cars

See also
Matsumoto Electric Railway
Kawanakajima Bus

External links
Suwa Bus

Bus companies of Japan
Companies based in Nagano Prefecture